Randolph Hotel may refer to:

in England
 Randolph Hotel, Oxford, England

in the United States
 Randolph Hotel (Des Moines, Iowa), on the National Register of Historic Places in Iowa, also known as Hotel Randolph
 Randolph Hotel (Chicago), temporary name of the former Bismarck Hotel in Chicago, now Hotel Allegro